Greyish saltator has been split into three species:
 Bluish-grey saltator, Saltator coerulescens
 Cinnamon-bellied saltator, Saltator grandis
 Olive-grey saltator, Saltator olivascens

Birds by common name